Alpine Elementary School District is a K-8 public school district with headquarters in Alpine, unincorporated Apache County, Arizona. It consists of one school, Alpine Elementary School.

References

External links

 

School districts in Apache County, Arizona
Education on the Navajo Nation